The Anomphalidae is an extinct family of fossil sea snails, marine gastropod mollusks. These are archaeogastropods which are included in the suborder Trochina. The Anomphalidae lived during the Paleozoic, from the Silurian to the Middle Permian. According to some authorities these snails belong instead to the Euomphalacea.

Morphologic diagnosis 
Shells of the Anomphalidae are rounded, almost discoidal, low-spired trochospiral inform, possibly with a globular body whorl. The aperture is oval, without exhalent slit or crease. The umbilicus is narrow, open or closed. The inner shell layer is seemingly nacreous.  The shell surface is generally smooth, ornamentation consisting of fine transverse lyrae or growth lines parallel to the aperture lip.

The Anomphalidae differ from the Euomphalcea to which they have been reassigned  in being more trochoidal, in lacking the angulation on the upper whorl surface characteristic of Euomphalacea, and in having the inner shell layer seemingly nacreous. (The inner shell layers of the Euomphalacea may be of laminar aragonite, but are never nacreous.)  The Anomphalidea differ from the Pleurotomariacea in lacking the often deep slit or selenizone, which is characteristic of that taxon.

Taxonomy  
J Brooks Knight, et al, in the Treatise, 1960, assigned 10 genera to the Annomphalidae. They are 
Anomphalus Meek and Worthen 1866, the type genus
Cycloscena Fletcher 1958
Eiselia Dietz 1911Isonema Meek and Worthen 1866Pycnomphalus Lindström 1884Turbocheilus Perner 1907Sosiolytes Gemmellaro 1889Straparella Fischer 1885Turbinilopsis de Koninck 1881Tychonia de Koninck 1881

At present the Anompalideae   has been expanded to include 17 genera in two subfamilies established by Peel, 1984.

Added to Anomphalus, Cycloscena, Eiselia, and Isonema in the Anomphalinae are: Antirotiela Cossmann 1918, given in the Treatise as a synonym for Anomphalus Frydacosta Cook and Nützel 2005Delphinuella Heidelberger 2001Givediscus Heidelberger 2001Littorella Heidelberger 2001Nodinella Heidelberger 2001
 
Contained within the Pycnomphalinae in addition to  Pycnomphalus, Turbocheilus, Sosiolites, Strapariella, and Tychonia:Pycnotrochus Perner 1903Turbinilopsis de Koninck 1881Pycnotrochus, from the Upper Silurian of Europe, was removed from the Sinuopeidae (Pleurotomariacea); the lip has a sinus more characteristic of the original family. Turbinopsis'', from the Lower Devonian of North America, was removed from the Palaeotrochidae (Palaeotrochacea); has a spiral chord not found on typical Anomphalidae and an aperture with a thicker, wider lip, also atypical.

Bouchet & Rocroi, 2005 simply included the Anomphalidae in "basal taxa that are certainly Gastropoda".

References 

Prehistoric gastropods
Prehistoric mollusc families
Paleozoic molluscs
Silurian first appearances
Guadalupian extinctions
Trochoidea (superfamily)